Elachista arduella is a moth of the family Elachistidae. It is found in Russia (the Southern Ural Mountains).

The wingspan is about 7.6 mm. The forewing ground colour is creamy white, with irregular patches formed of brownish grey tipped scales. The hindwings are translucent, pale bluish grey with a pale ochreous grey fringe.

References

arduella
Moths described in 2003
Endemic fauna of Russia
Moths of Europe